GNU Guix System or Guix System (previously GuixSD) is a rolling release, free and open source Linux distribution built around the GNU Guix package manager. It enables a declarative operating system configuration and allows reliable system upgrades which the user can rollback. It uses the GNU Shepherd init system and the Linux-libre kernel, with support for the GNU Hurd kernel under development. On February 3, 2015, the Free Software Foundation added the distribution to its list of endorsed free Linux distributions. The Guix package manager and the Guix System drew inspiration from and were based on the Nix package manager and NixOS respectively.

Architecture support 
The following CPU architectures are supported: IA-32, x86-64, ARM7, AArch64, POWER9.

Features

System services 
System services, defined in Guile Scheme, enable the user to declaratively compose the configuration of daemons and background services and specify configurations. This enables the user, within a single configuration file or modularized configuration, to configure the whole operating system (e.g., to have a tor proxy, an sshd server, and a webserver serving guix-web via nginx on a specific port at bootup). They can: 
 generate files in the filesystem (needed by some applications e.g. files in /etc)
 run any code for setting up daemons
 create specific user and group accounts (e.g. a database user for postgresql)

GNU Shepherd init system 
The Guix System uses the GNU Daemon Shepherd, formerly known as "dmd" ("Daemon managing Daemons"), as its init system, which is developed in tandem with Guix and is written and configurable in Guile. It supplies user-space functionality asynchronously as services, which under Shepherd are generic functions and object data types which it uses to extend the base operating system in a defined way. In contrast to systemd, a userspace shepherd process runs as the user. Central to the Shepherd model of user space initialization is the concept of the extension, a form of composability whereby services are designed to be layered onto other services, augmenting them with more elaborate or specialised behaviours as desired. This expresses the instantiation-based dependency relationships found in many modern init systems, making the system modular, but also allows services to interact variadically with other services in arbitrary ways, e.g. a service which extends two other services, requiring only one to be present, but readily extending the second one if it is later instantiated without the need for any further reconfiguration or setup.

Shepherd also provides virtual services which allow dynamic dispatch over a class of related service objects, such as all those which instantiate a mail transfer agent (MTA) for the system. A system governed via the Shepherd daemon can represent its user space as a directed acyclic graph, with the "system-service," which is responsible for early phases of boot and init, as its root, and all subsequently initialized services as extensions to system-service functionality, either directly or transitively over other services.

It is intended to be highly programmable by the system administrator using Guile, but it can also be used to manage per-user profiles of unprivileged daemons and services. Its services and configuration are stored uniformly as object-oriented Scheme code, and while a core set of services are provided with the basic Guix System, arbitrary new services can be flexibly declared, and through Guile's object system, GOOPS, existing services can be redefined at the user's discretion by asking the Shepherd to dynamically rewrite services in specified ways on instantiation.

GNU Shepherd was originally designed to work with GNU Hurd, and was later adopted by Guix System.

Release and stability 
To date, the Guix System is dependent on unstable git repository development shared with Guix but enables users or organizations to set up stable release channels themselves via the channel-feature.

Updates 
Packages in Guix are generally very up-to-date thanks to the lack of a package maintainer bottlenecks. Anyone can contribute an update subject to community approval and the process is assisted by tools such as guix refresh.

Changes to the git repository are peer-reviewed by community members and committed by one of the 45 people with commit access. In practice these builds sometimes cause system breakages for users because of a typo or similar error, but these are often solved within minutes. The way Guix pull operates means users retain a working system in the meantime.

Roll-back 
If a system update leaves users with a broken system, users can easily roll back individual packages as well as the whole system state. This means that the kind of stable channel that is very common in other Linux distributions is no longer needed for users who are willing to report a bug and wait a few minutes, when trying to update via guix pull.

Reception 

Jesse Smith from DistroWatch Weekly reviewed GNU Guix System 0.15.0 (at the time named GuixSD), and said, "GuixSD has a package manager that I like", but criticized the limited hardware support and its limited documentation. The documentation has since then been expanded and improved with videos and a cookbook in six languages with tutorials, how-to guides and examples.

See also 

 GNU Guix
 Debian GNU/Hurd
 Comparison of Linux distributions
 NixOS – A similar operating system, which inspired GNU Guix

References

External links 

 
 
 List of Guix packages

Guix
Free software only Linux distributions
GNU Project
Free package management systems
Free software programmed in Lisp
Functional programming
GNU Project software
Linux package management-related software
Linux distributions without systemd
Rolling Release Linux distributions
Linux distributions
Independent Linux distributions